The 2005 Tulane Green Wave football team represented Tulane University in the 2005 NCAA Division I-A football season.  Their home stadium, the Louisiana Superdome, was damaged by Hurricane Katrina in August 2005 and forced the Green Wave to play the entire season on the road with "home" games being played at five different stadiums in Louisiana and one in Alabama. They competed in the West Division of Conference USA. The team was coached by head coach Chris Scelfo.

Schedule

Roster

References

Tulane
Tulane Green Wave football seasons
Tulane Green Wave football